Rishra is a census town in Sreerampur Uttarpara CD Block in Srirampore subdivision of Hooghly district in the Indian state of West Bengal. It is a part of Kolkata Urban Agglomeration.

Geography

Location
Rishra (CT) is located at 

Rishra (CT), Bamunari, Nawapara, Nabagram Colony, Kanaipur , Basai and Raghunathpur (PS-Dankuni) form a cluster of census towns on the eastern side of the series of statutory towns/ cities – Rishra, Konnagar and Uttarpara.

The area consists of flat alluvial plains, that form a part of the Gangetic Delta. This belt is highly industrialised.

Urbanisation
Srirampore subdivision is the most urbanized of the subdivisions in Hooghly district. 73.13% of the population in the subdivision is urban and 26.88% is rural. The subdivision has 6 municipalities and 34 census towns. The municipalities are: Uttarpara Kotrung Municipality, Konnagar Municipality, Serampore Municipality, Baidyabati Municipality, Rishra Municipality and Dankuni Municipality. Amongst the CD Blocks in the subdivision, Uttarapara Serampore (census towns shown in the map alongside) had 76% urban population, Chanditala I 42%, Chanditala II 69% and Jangipara 7% (census towns in the last 3 CD Blocks are shown in a separate map). All places marked in the map are linked in the larger full screen map.

Demographics
As per 2011 Census of India Rishra (CT) had a total population of 16,503 of which 8,492 (51%) were males and 8,011 (49%) were females. Population below 6 years was 725. The total number of literates in Rishra (CT) was 13,414 (85.02% of the population over 6 years).

Kolkata Urban Agglomeration
The following Municipalities and Census Towns in Hooghly district were part of Kolkata Urban Agglomeration in 2011 census: Bansberia (M), Hugli-Chinsurah (M), Bara Khejuria (Out Growth), Shankhanagar (CT), Amodghata (CT), Chak Bansberia (CT), Naldanga (CT), Kodalia (CT), Kulihanda (CT),  Simla (CT), Dharmapur (CT), Bhadreswar (M), Champdani (M), Chandannagar (M Corp.), Baidyabati (M), Serampore (M), Rishra (M), Rishra (CT), Bamunari (CT), Dakshin Rajyadharpur (CT), Nabagram Colony (CT), Konnagar (M), Uttarpara Kotrung (M), Raghunathpur (PS-Dankuni) (CT), Kanaipur (CT) and Keota (CT).

Transport
Rishra railway station on the Howrah-Bardhaman main line serves the locality.

References

Cities and towns in Hooghly district
Neighbourhoods in Kolkata
Kolkata Metropolitan Area